WMCD (106.5 FM) is a radio station broadcasting a country format. Licensed to Rocky Ford, Georgia, United States, the station is currently owned by Bryan Steele, through licensee Foundry Broadcasting LLC.

References

External links

MCD
Country radio stations in the United States
Radio stations established in 1992
1992 establishments in Georgia (U.S. state)